Ilonka Giovanna Elmont (born September 11, 1974) is a Surinamese-Dutch professional Muay Thai kickboxer. Better knowns as "The Killer Queen". She is 7 x World Champion, 1 x European Champion and 2 x Dutch Champion in the Fly-Weight division (-50.80 kg - 52.16 kg). Elmont was a professional competitor since 1997. She competed in the 2H2H, SLAMM events, Danger Zone events and holds world titles of various fighting organizations such as WMTC, MTBN, IMKO, EPMTF, NKBB. Elmont was famous for her unorthodox fighting style with fast combinations and stinging knees. She is a technical all-round and skilled fighter with powerful kicks and knee strikes and clinching. With her unorthodox fighting style she surprised many experienced fighters and had a tendency to go head-to-head with her opponents. She is known as one of the top ranked female fighters of the Netherlands such as Lucia Rijker, Denise Kielholtz, Marloes Coenen and  Germaine de Randamie.

Early life 
Ilonka was born in Paramaribo, Suriname. Raised by her grandparents her and at the age of nine, she moved to the Amsterdam to live with her parents. As a young child Ilonka had lots of energy but wasn't allowed to do martial arts.

Fighting career 
Elmont started her martial arts career at late age. Jerry Morris, former multiple world champion, invited her to visit Kops Gym and train. Although Ilonka wasn't really interested she participated. Resulting that the legendary trainer, former world champion, currently one of the World's most respected and successful coaches Lucien Carbin noticed her talent and challenged it to the max. Her fighting style, the blend of passion, talent and ambition Lucien saw and combined with his training program resulted in seven world titles, one European title and two Dutch titles. Not long after their collaboration Lucien founded his own gym Fighting Factory Carbin in Amsterdam, which is considered one of the best martial arts gyms in the Netherlands. Carbin brought up 49 multiple world champions in different versions of martial arts notable names. Elmonts stable mates were Gilbert Yvel, Alistair Overeem, Tyrone Spong, Andy Ristie, Sergio Wielzen. Till now Ilonka Elmont is the only female multiple world champion that Lucien has raised amongst all those men. In 1999 Elmont joined the 1st Golden Glory Team with MMA and Kickboxing rosters as Gilbert Yvel, Valentijn Overeem, Alistair Overeem, Ramon Dekkers, Stephan Tapilatu, Remco Pardoel, Martijn de Jong, Heath Herring, Semmy Schilt and others. During her fighting career Elmont fought many notable fighters from all over the world in and above her weight division.

Championships and accomplishments
Elmont previously held the following titles:
 World Champion IMKO –50,8KG
 World Champion WPKL –50,8KG
 World Champion IMKO –51,0KG
 World Champion WPKL -52,1KG 
 World Champion WMTC –51,5KG 
 World Champion WPKL –50,8KG
 World Champion WMTC –51,5KG
 European Champion EPMTF –50,8KG
 Dutch Champion NKBB –50,8KG
 Dutch Champion MTBN –52,1KG

Records 
 1999 WPKL style price of the event
 2000 WPKL style price of the event
 2000 Ranked 19th place of the Rings Top 25 fighters 
 2001 - 2003 Nominated for the Best female fighter of the year

Other achievements 
 2005 Ambassador of Peoples 
 Trust Foundation Honorary citizen of Amsterdam South East

Filmography and TV appearances

Movies 
Elmont acted in the following movies and series:
 Color me bad as Karin 
 Schimmen as an enemy; pilot serie directed by Roef Ragas 
 Van Speijk as Myrna Griffith and Nathalja (7 episodes)

TV appearances as self 
 Waar is de Mol (2008)
 Spuiten en Slikken (BNN, 2008)
 Mike & Thomas Show (2007) and video
 Jensen (Yorin, 2006)
 Rallarsving (Swedish Television series, episode 1, 2005) and video
 Try before you die start at 11.26 (BNN, 2005)
 Fight the Virus AIDS Campaign (2005)
 Katja vs Bridget as the trainer of Katja (BNN,2005)
 Barend en Van Dorp (RTL4, 2004)
 Gemma Glitter (NPO, 2004)
 Lijn 4 (BNN, 2004)
 Kevin Masters starring Thom Rhodes (2003) and video
 Week van Willibrord (SBS6, 2003)
 Menno Buch following opponent Cunera Cremers during Dutch title fight in Ahoy, Rotterdam (Veronica, 2000)
 Klokhuis (NTR, 2003)
 De smaak politie (SBS6, 2003)
 Life and Cooking (2000)
 Later wordt het leuk (VARA, 2000)
 Vals plat with Gilbert Yvel (NPS,1999)

Documentary 
 Pioneers Veronica Fight video (2019)
 Iedereen Verlicht (2019)
 The Killer Queen (2004)  
 Fighting Factory (Video) by Wout Kist
 Ton Vechters deel 1 (video) hosted by Ton van Rooyen 
 Ton Vechters deel 2 (video)  hosted by Ton van Rooyen

Personal life 
Elmont became a mother in 2009, she has a son named Jaedon.

Current Activities
Elmont is an ambassador of Ilonka Elmont Foundation which contributes to the sports development for underprivileged children and children with a disability by creating awareness, new chances in the underprivileged communities.

See also 
 List of female kickboxers
 Kickboxing
 Dutch kickboxing

External links 

 Ilonka Elmont Youtube page 
 Ilonka Elmont Instagram

References 

 

1974 births
Living people
Sportspeople from Paramaribo
Sportspeople from Amsterdam
Dutch Muay Thai practitioners
Dutch female kickboxers
Surinamese Muay Thai practitioners
Surinamese female kickboxers
Bantamweight kickboxers
Flyweight kickboxers